Llanarmon may refer to one of several villages in Wales:

Llanarmon, Gwynedd, also known as Llanarmon Eifionydd
Llanarmon Dyffryn Ceiriog, Ceiriog Valley near Wrexham
Llanarmon Mynydd Mawr, a small settlement and parish in Powys
Llanarmon-yn-Iâl, Denbighshire